The Arboretum Saint-Jean-de-la-Motte is the arboretum located along a botanical path in Saint-Jean-de-la-Motte, Sarthe, Pays de la Loire, France. It contains over 200 trees and is open daily without charge.

See also 
 List of botanical gardens in France

References 
 Gralon entry (French)
 Vallée du Loir entry
 Western Loire entry

Saint-Jean-de-la-Motte, Arboretum
Saint-Jean-de-la-Motte, Arboretum